The Royal College of Music, Stockholm is the oldest institution of higher education in music in Sweden, founded in 1771 as the conservatory of the Royal Swedish Academy of Music. The institution was made independent of the Academy in 1971, and is now a public authority directly under the Ministry of Education and Research. Vice-Chancellor from June 2019 is Helena Wessman, former general manager of Berwaldhallen.

Notable alumni

Composers
Hugo Alfvén
Anton Jörgen Andersen
Natanael Berg
Viking Dahl (also a notable painter and author)
Gunnar de Frumerie (also a notable pianist)
Harald Fryklöf
Ludwig Göransson
Anders Hillborg
Jacob Adolf Hägg
Hannah Holgersson
Lars-Erik Larsson
Ruben Liljefors (also a notable conductor)
Nils Lindberg (also a notable pianist)
Pär Lindgren
Edward McGuire (studied with composer Ingvar Lidholm 1971)
Erland von Koch
Otto Olsson
Karin Rehnqvist
Amanda Röntgen-Maier
Ákos Rózmann
Jan Sandström
Sven-David Sandström
Carl Unander-Scharin
Elsa Stuart-Bergstrom
Tore Uppström (also a notable pianist and author)
Adolf Wiklund (also a notable conductor)
Dag Wirén
Đuro Živković
Swani Zubayeer

Conductors
Herbert Blomstedt
Ragnar Bohlin
Sixten Ehrling
Eric Ericson
Nils Grevillius
Veronika Portsmuth
Patrik Ringborg
Cecilia Rydinger Alin
Erik Westberg
Niklas Willén
Adolf Wiklund (also a composer)
Ariel Zuckermann (also a flutist)

Instrumentalists
Adrien Mikael Agreste, pianist 
Tor Aulin, violinist
Carolina Eyck, theremin player
Fredrik Fors, clarinetist
Martin Fröst, clarinetist
Gustaf Hägg, organist and composer
David Hughes, bass player
Anna Lang, harpist
Ingrid Lang-Fagerström, harpist
Christian Lindberg, trombone soloist
Alf Linder, organist
Henrik Linder, bass player
Anders Lundegård, saxophonist
Ellen Nisbeth, violist
Mika Pohjola, jazz pianist and composer
Monica Ramos, harpist
Markus Sandlund, cellist
Staffan Scheja, pianist
Esbjörn Svensson, jazz pianist and founder of the jazz group Esbjörn Svensson Trio
Mats Widlund, pianist
Mats Zetterqvist, violinist
Andreas Öberg, jazz guitarist
Andreas Johansson, drummer in Narnia and Royal Hunt

Vocalists
Pernilla Andersson, singer and songwriter
Margareta Bengtson, soprano and founding member of The Real Group
Jussi Björling, tenor
Anders Edenroth, tenor and founding member of The Real Group
Selma Ek, soprano
Malena Ernman, soprano
John Forsell, baritone
Ellen Gulbranson, soprano
Erland Hagegård, baritone / tenor
Håkan Hagegård, baritone
Anders Jalkéus, bass and founding member of The Real Group
Peter Jöback, singer and musical artist
Sofia Karlsson, folk singer
Leonard Labatt, tenor
Peter Mattei, baryton
Kerstin Meyer, mezzo-soprano 
Birgit Nilsson, soprano
Anne Sofie von Otter, mezzo-soprano
Olle Persson, baryton
Susanne Rydén, soprano
Elisabeth Söderström, soprano
Kerstin Thorborg, mezzo-soprano
Lena Willemark, folk singer

Others
Rasmus Fleischer, Swedish historian, musician, freelance journalist and debater
Elsa Stuart-Bergstrom, author and music critic

External links

 Official webpage

 
Music schools in Sweden
1771 in Sweden
Higher education in Stockholm
University colleges in Sweden
1771 establishments in Sweden